Broker Bheeshmachari (Kannada: ಬ್ರೋಕರ್ ಭೀಷ್ಮಾಚಾರಿ) is a 1969 Indian Kannada film, directed by B. C. Srinivas and produced by M. S. Shivaraj. The film stars Rajashankar, Rajesh, Narasimharaju and Dinesh. The film has musical score by Vasanth Kumar.

Cast

Rajashankar
Rajesh
Narasimharaju
Dinesh
Eshwarappa
Jayanthi
Shailashree
Indira
M. N. Lakshmidevi
Vijayabhanu
Kusuma
Shyam
Kuppuraj
Guggu
Madan
Ugranarasimha
Puttaswamy
Dinesh
Siddaramanna
B. Narayana Rao
Prabha
Vijayashree
Raghavendra Rao
Rajanikanth

References

External links
 

1969 films
1960s Kannada-language films